Kunzangdrak is a Buddhist sacred site in the Tang Valley of central Bhutan. It lies at an altitude of 3,350 metres (10,990 feet) in the hollow of a cliff. Guru Rinpoche and his disciple Namkhai Nyingpo are said to have meditated here at the end of the 8th century. The current temple, however, was established in 1488 by Pema Lingpa. Aside from Pema Lingpa's living quarters, the site consists of three temples, the Wangkhang, which has the main statue of Avalokiteshvara with a thousand eyes and a thousand hands,Özerphug, the meditation cave of Pema Lingpa's son, Tuksey Dawa Gyeltsen (ཐུགས་སྲས་ཟླ་བ་རྒྱལ་མཚན) and the Khandroma Lhakang, which contains a gilded copper statue of Pema Lingpa.

References

External links
 Kunzangdrak Monastery

Religious buildings and structures completed in 1488
Buddhist monasteries in Bhutan
Tibetan Buddhist monasteries
Tibetan Buddhism in Bhutan